The Capture of Novgorod by the Swedes was an event of the Time of Troubles, which entailed the Swedish occupation of Novgorod from July 1611 until its return to the Russian Kingdom in the Treaty of Stolbovo in 1617.

Background
According to the Vyborg Treatise of 1609, concluded between Tsar Vasily Shuisky and Sweden, the latter agreed to provide him with military assistance in the fight against False Dmitry II and the Polish–Lithuanian invaders in exchange for territorial concessions. Thus began the campaign of Delagardi to Russia. The Swedish corps fought as part of the army of Prince Mikhail Skopin-Shuisky, who managed to clear a significant part of Russia from the interventionists and to release the besieged Moscow. However, in the Battle of Klushino, the Russian–Swedish army was defeated, after which Vasily Shuisky was overthrown, and the Poles occupied Moscow.

Jacob De la Gardie considered that Russia had not fulfilled its obligations to Sweden, and began to occupy part of the Russian north–west. The motivation was the general weakening of the Russian state, which allowed for an aggressive policy, rivalry with the Commonwealth, as well as the personal interest of the Swedish military leaders, including Delagardi, in rich military booty.

Storming of Novgorod
At the beginning of June 1611, the army of De la Gardie, consisting of Swedish, Finnish, German and other mercenaries, approached Novgorod and stood at the Khutynsky Monastery. The governor of the city was Ivan Nikitich Odoevsky, who led a garrison of a little more than two thousand people – Cossacks, nobles, Astrakhan archers, as well as a small number of Tatars and monastery servants. The garrison had at its disposal relatively large artillery, but the city fortifications were dilapidated.

Governor Vasily Buturlin was sent to De la Gardie on behalf of the Zemsky Sobor (government) near Moscow, headed by Prokopy Lyapunov, who entered into negotiations with the Swedes. In exchange for military assistance against the Poles, the establishment of the Swedish prince Charles Philip to the Moscow throne, as well as the transfer of Ladoga and Oreshek to Sweden, were discussed. However, the Novgorodians were outraged by territorial concessions and rejected Buturlin's agreement plans. Negotiations came to a standstill and De la Gardie decided to storm the city.

On July 8, the Swedes attacked Okolny City, but it was repelled. On July 12, city defenders made a sortie. On July 16, De la Gardie launched a second decisive assault. A small detachment was instructed to make a distracting maneuver from the east side of the city. Another distracting maneuver was the attack of the Swedes in small vessels on a floating tower, set by the defenders on the Volkhov near Borisoglebskaya and Petrovskaya towers. Taking advantage of the fact that the defenders focused on the defense of the eastern side and did not expect an attack from the west, the Delagardi warriors went on the assault on Okolny City in several areas at once. Most successfully they acted near the Chudintsev Gate, laying several firecrackers. Sources report assistance to the Swedes from a certain Ivashka Shval, a boyar slave. The infantry rushed into the resulting gaps, which soon recaptured the Chudintsev Gates from the defenders and opened them to De la Gardie's strong cavalry. From the towers of Okolny City, the Russians methodically fired on the Swedes, however, after the cavalry attack, which began to quickly take over the streets, the fate of the city, despite the stubborn foci of resistance, was a foregone conclusion. A fire and general panic began in the city. Buturlin's warriors, who didn't initially have a good relationship with Odoevsky, after a brief resistance to the Swedes fled to the Trade Side, robbing its along the way, and then retreated to Yaroslavl. With a quick strike, the Swedes captured the Great Bridge over the Volkhov, cutting off the remaining defenders' path to retreat.

Having taken the Okolny City, De la Gardie entered into negotiations with the people of Prince Odoyevsky, who were in the detinets. Due to the futility of further resistance, an agreement was concluded under which De la Gardie joined the Detinets on July 17. Novgorod completely came under the control of the Swedes.

Occupation period
Odoevsky signed a treaty with De la Gardie "on behalf of the Novgorod state", according to which the Swedish king Charles IX was recognized as the "patron of Russia", and the prince Charles Philip as the "heir to the Russian throne". The accession to the treaty of the "Moscow and Vladimir States" was welcomed. Prior to the arrival of the prince, the contract provided for the transfer of control to De la Gardie and Swedish officials. In fact, the agreement concluded meant the separation of Novgorod land from the general Zemstvo movement of Russia.

The rest of the agreement repeated the provisions of the Teusina and Vyborg Treaties, maintained the old order in administration and legal proceedings, guaranteed the inviolability of the Orthodox faith and emphasized the alliance against the Commonwealth. The Swedish administration was carried out according to Russian laws and was duplicated by the Novgorod administration. The sympathies of the nobility were attracted by generous land awards on behalf of the prince. Novgorodians pledged to support the Swedes in their hostilities.

After the election of Mikhail Romanov to the kingdom in 1613 and the loss by the Swedish king of the chances of the Moscow throne, the Swedish position in Novgorod was tightened. Evert Horn, who ruled Novgorod in 1614–1615, pursued a policy of direct subordination of Novgorod to the Swedish crown. Only the military failures of the Swedes, in particular during the Siege of Pskov in 1615, set King Gustav II Adolf to peace talks.

Novgorod returned to Moscow under the Treaty of Stolbovo of 1617. One of the most complete collections of documents of Novgorod office work during the Swedish occupation is the Novgorod occupation archive, which is stored in the State Archive of Sweden in Stockholm.

See also
 Swedish–Novgorodian Wars

Sources
German Zamyatin. Russia and Sweden at the Beginning of the 17th Century – Saint Petersburg, 2008
Elena Kobzareva. Swedish Occupation of Novgorod During the Time of Troubles of the 17th Century / Elena Kobzareva – Moscow: Institute of Russian History, Russian Academy of Sciences, 2005
Adrian Selin. Novgorod Society in the Time of Troubles – Saint Petersburg, 2008
Ivan Shepelev. Swedish Intervention in Russia and the Attitude of the First Zemstvo Militia Towards It // Collection of Scientific Papers of the Pyatigorsk State Pedagogical Institute – Pyatigorsk, 1949. Issue 4

References

Novgorod
1611 in Russia
Novgorod
History of Veliky Novgorod